Nimdih railway station is a railway station on Purulia–Tatanagar line of Adra railway division of Indian Railways' South Eastern Railway zone. It is situated beside National Highway 32 at Nimdih in Seraikela Kharsawan district in the Indian state of Jharkhand. Total 12 trains stop at Nimdih railway station.

History
The Bengal Nagpur Railway was formed in 1887 for the purpose of upgrading the Nagpur Chhattisgarh Railway. Purulia–Chakradharpur rail line was opened on 22 January 1890. The Purulia–Chakradharpur rout including Nimdih railway station was electrified in 1961–62.

References

Adra railway division
Railway stations in Seraikela Kharsawan district
1890 establishments in India